Homoeosoma straminea is a species of snout moth in the genus Homoeosoma. It was described by Walter Rothschild in 1921. It is found in Niger.

References

Phycitini
Moths described in 1921
Snout moths of Africa
Endemic fauna of Niger
Moths of Africa